Pamela Anne Quiroz (born March 28, 1960) is an American sociologist. She has been a professor of sociology at the University of Houston, and director of the Center for Mexican American Studies there, since the fall of 2015. Previously, she was a professor of sociology and educational policy studies at the University of Illinois-Chicago. She has been the editor-in-chief of Social Problems since 2014. Her research interests include the development of individual identities among school students.

References

External links
Faculty page

1960 births
Living people
American women social scientists
American women sociologists
Academic journal editors
American sociologists
University of Houston faculty
University of Illinois Chicago faculty
Missouri Western State University alumni
Iowa State University alumni
University of Chicago alumni
American academics of Mexican descent
21st-century American women